Meshir 28 - Coptic Calendar - Meshir 30 

The twenty-ninth day of the Coptic month of Meshir, the sixth month of the Coptic year. In common years, this day corresponds to February 23, of the Julian Calendar, and March 8, of the Gregorian Calendar. This day falls in the Coptic Season of Shemu, the season of the Harvest.

Commemorations

Martyrs 

 The martyrdom of Saint Polycarp, Bishop of Smyrna

References 

Days of the Coptic calendar